"Everyday" is a song by American rapper ASAP Rocky. It was released on May 8, 2015, as the second single from his second studio album At. Long. Last. ASAP (2015), to make up for the delay of the album. The song, co-produced by Mark Ronson alongside a sample appearance from "In a Broken Dream" by Python Lee Jackson (featuring vocals from Rod Stewart), also features singer Miguel. Rolling Stone ranked "Everyday" at number 38 on its annual year-end list to find the best songs of 2015.

Charts

Certifications

Release history

References

External links

2015 singles
2015 songs
ASAP Rocky songs
Rod Stewart songs
Miguel (singer) songs
Mark Ronson songs
Songs written by Miguel (singer)
Songs written by Mark Ronson
Song recordings produced by Mark Ronson
Songs written by ASAP Rocky
Song recordings produced by Emile Haynie